Chatra district is one of the twenty-four districts of Jharkhand state, India. The district was formed after separation from Hazaribagh district in 1991. Chatra is the administrative headquarters of this district. The district covers an area of 3718 km2.

History

Ancient period
In ancient period, the area covered by the present district and adjoining areas were ruled by a number of states, which were collectively known as the Atavika (forest) states. These states accepted the suzerainty of the Maurya empire during Ashoka's reign ( BCE). Samudragupta, while marching through the present-day Chotanagpur region, directed the first attack against the kingdom of Dakshina Kosala in the Mahanadi valley.

Medieval period
During Muhammad bin Tughluq's reign, the territory which comprises the present district came in contact with the Delhi sultanate. Later, it became a part of the Bihar Subah of the Mughal empire. Daud Khan, the Mughal Subahdar of Bihar, during the reign of Aurangzeb occupied Kothi near Pokhri Fort on 5 May 1660, without much opposition, and then he moved towards the fort of Kunda which had a very strong fortification as it was situated on a hilltop. This fort was finally occupied by him and was completely destroyed on the 2 June 1660. Later, Kunda Fort was under the possession of the Raja of Ramgarh. In 1734, Aliwardi Khan advanced towards Kunda after defeating the rebel Zamindars of Tikari (Gaya). He mounted an attack on Chatra Fort and demolished it.

British rule
The British East India Company came in contact with this region for the first time in 1769. Raja Rammohan Roy, worked as a serestadar at Chatra from 1805–06 and stayed both at Chatra and Ramgarh while in office.

The most important battle fought between the insurgents and the British in Chotanagpur during the rebellion of 1857 was the "Battle of Chatra". This decisive battle was fought on 2 October 1857, near Phansi Talab. It lasted for an hour in which the mutineers were completely defeated. 56 European soldiers and officers were killed whereas 150 revolutionaries were killed and 77 were buried in a pit. Subedar Mangal Pandey and Nadir Ali Khan were sentenced and hanged to death on the 4 October 1857 on this very spot. The European and Sikh soldiers were buried in a well along with their arms and ammunitions. An inscriptive plaque which is still extant states:
"56 men of Her Majesty's 53rd Regiment of foot and a party of Sikhs were killed at Chatra on October 2nd 1857 in action against mutineers of the Ramgarh Battalion. Lieutenant J. C. C. Daunt of the 70th Bengal Native Infantry and sergeant D. Dynon of the 53rd regiment were awarded Victoria Cross for conspicuous gallantry in the battle, in which the mutineers were completely defeated and lost all their four guns and ammunitions. At the same time, another inscription on the bank of the Phansi Talab immortalises the two revolutionary subedars, namely, Mangal Pandey and Nadir Ali Khan.

Independence movement
The independence movement in this district gathered momentum in 1921. One of the most significant events of the Quit India Movement in 1942, was the escape of Jai Prakash Narayan along with six other from The Hazaribagh Central Jail on 9 November 1942 (the night of festival of Diwali). Jai Prakash Narayan came to Tatra (a village in this district )where he was at the home of panchkodi dubey, and then proceeded towards Sherghati en route to Varanasi. The notable participants in the independence movement from this district include Chotanagpur Kesri, Babu Ram Narayan Singh, and Babu Shaligram Singh.

Post-independence

The district is currently a part of the Red Corridor.

Administration 
The territory covered by the present district was earlier known as Chatra sub-division of Hazaribagh district.

Politics 

 |}

Blocks/Mandals 

Chatra district consists of 10 Blocks. The following are the list of the Blocks in Chatra district:

Demographics
According to the 2011 census Chatra district has a population of 1,042,886, roughly equal to the nation of Cyprus or the US state of Rhode Island. This gives it a ranking of 434rd in India (out of a total of 640).
Its population growth rate over the decade 2001-2011 was 28.98%. Chatra has a sex ratio of 951 females for every 1000 males, and a literacy rate of 60.18%. Scheduled Castes (SC) constitutes 32.7% while Schedule Tribes (ST) were 4.4% of total population.

Hindus make up 86.6% of the population while Muslims make up 11.19%. Christianity makes up 0.63%, while other religions make up 1.58% of the population.

At the time of the 2011 Census of India, 39.71% of the population in the district spoke Khortha, 39.21% Hindi, 12.47% Magahi, 5.47% Urdu, 1.72% Kurukh.

Economy
In 2006, the Indian government named Chatra one of the country's 250 most backward districts (out of a total of 640). It is one of the 21 districts in Jharkhand currently receiving funds from the Backward Regions Grant Fund Programme (BRGF).

Politics 
Chatra has two assembly constituencies: Chatra and Simaria. Both are part of Chatra Lok Sabha Constituency

The MP from Chatra is Sunil Kumar Singh from the Bharatiya Janata Party.

The MLA for Chatra is Shatya nand Bhogta (RJD), while the MLA of Simaria is Ganesh Ganjhu (BJP).

Tourism

The district of Chatra, gateway of Jharkhand has a number of picnic spots and fountains, waterfalls and flora and fauna. 
Some of the tourist spots of Chatra include:
 Bhadrakali temple:- It is at Itkhori, 35 km on the East of Chatra and 16 km west of Chauparan connected with Grand Trunk Road. Along with the temple situated on the bank of river Mahanad (Mahane) surrounded by hill and forest, there is a water reservoir.
 Kunda Cave:- The ruins of old Kunda palace are still found at a distance of about three-four miles from the present Kunda Village. The place might have been created either towards the end of 17th or beginning of the 18th century AD.
 Tamasin:- Word tamasin is a sandhi of 'tam+asin'  which means 'darkness prevails '. This area has mixed forest having high trees making the area dark even in the daylight. Tamasin has a waterfall.
Besides these there are a number of waterfalls in Chatra.

Maa Kauleswary Temple: - Maa Kauleswary Mandir is situated near Hunterganj block in Kedli kalan village. It is approx 10 km from Hunterganj and the temple is situated on the hill which has 650 feet height. A Budha temple is also situated on Kuleswary hill and every year thousands of visitor are coming to visit the temples and natural environment of this area also.

References

External links
 Official district website

 
Districts of Jharkhand
1991 establishments in Bihar